Edith Magonigle (May 11, 1877 – August 8, 1949) was an American painter. Her work was part of the painting event in the art competition at the 1932 Summer Olympics.

References

1877 births
1949 deaths
20th-century American painters
American women painters
Olympic competitors in art competitions
People from Brooklyn
20th-century American women artists